Emirhan Delibaş (born 1 January 2003) is a Turkish professional footballer who plays as a midfielder for Göztepe on loan from Beşiktaş.

Club career

Beşiktaş 
Emirhan Delibaş, who was trained at Beşiktaş Football Academy, became a phenomenon in the social media with his goal against Sporting Lisbon in 2015. Arda Turan, whom Emirhan Delibaş said "I want to meet the most", shared Emirhan's goal on his social media account by saying "Mashallah". Daily Mirror, which published Emirhan's goal on its website, had the headline "Turkish Cristiano Ronaldo".

Delibaş, who was at the squad before the 2022–23 season, played in friendly match against Werder Bremen. He scored one goal and assisted Oğuzhan Akgün in the goal that brought the victory. Delibaş, who was played in the pre-season camp, was included in the team squad by technical director Valérien Ismaël.

International career 
Delibaş played in the Turkey national under-19 football team.

References

External links 
 

2003 births
Living people
Turkish footballers
Turkey youth international footballers
Association football midfielders
Beşiktaş J.K. footballers
Göztepe S.K. footballers
TFF First League players